Leslie Harry Gardner (30 September 1923 – 28 May 2019) was an Australian rules footballer who played with St Kilda in the Victorian Football League (VFL).

Notes

External links 

1923 births
2019 deaths
Australian rules footballers from Melbourne
Prahran Football Club players
St Kilda Football Club players
People from Malvern, Victoria